Leonid Vitalievich Nevedomsky (13 October 1939 – 3 June 2018) was a Soviet and Russian actor. He appeared in more than 60 films and television shows between 1966 and 2007.

Biography 
Leonid Nevedomsky was born on 13 October 1939 in Vitebsk in the family of physicians Vitaly Iosifovich and Maria Markovna.  Named after the beloved singer of his father Leonid Utyosov. The elder brother   Leomark Vitalevich Nevyadomsky, soviet coach in handball.

Selected filmography
 Monologue (1972)
 Privalov's Millions (1972)
 Stepmom (1973)
 The Blue Bird (1976)
 Trust (1976)
 Khanuma (1978)
 Semyon Dezhnev (1983)
 Empire under Attack (2000)
 Deadly Force (2001)
 Streets of Broken Lights (2002)
 Bandit Petersburg (2003)

Nevedomsky about  actors profession
I really need my hero to love —  homeland, homeland, daughter, wife, brother, woman, just a man —  forgive me, for Christ's sake, for such words. He must love and suffer.

References

External links

1939 births
2018 deaths
Russian male film actors
Soviet male film actors
Russian male stage actors
Soviet male stage actors
Russian male television actors
Russian people of Belarusian descent
People from Vitebsk
Recipients of the Medal of the Order "For Merit to the Fatherland" II class
Recipients of the Medal of Pushkin
People's Artists of Russia
Honored Artists of the RSFSR
Communist Party of the Soviet Union members
Russian State Institute of Performing Arts alumni